The L. F. Harriman House, located at 111 2nd Ave., W, in Lemmon, South Dakota, is a concrete block house which was built in 1908.  It was listed on the National Register of Historic Places in 1976.

It is a one-and-a-half-story cottage with elements of Queen Anne style.

Its NRHP nomination notes its significance as "one of the finest examples of concrete block-faced homes in the state. Because there are so few older homes that are made of this material, it is important to recognize them for their contribution to South Dakota architecture."

References

Houses on the National Register of Historic Places in South Dakota
Queen Anne architecture in South Dakota
Houses completed in 1908
Perkins County, South Dakota